Agar Town (also known as Ague Town, Hagar Town, Agar-Town and Agar-town) was a short-lived relatively tiny area of St Pancras in central London. It is now the site of St Pancras railway station.

History
The area was named after William Agar, a wealthy lawyer who lived at Elm Lodge, a villa in large grounds near to the Regent's Canal roughly where Barker Drive stands. Key streets were Canterbury Place, Durham Street, and one of the city's Oxford Crescents. The area contained low-quality housing for the poor and labourers building the houses, made of the lowest quality materials on 21-year leases, with no street lighting, cleaning or sewerage. Consequently, Agar Town was generally considered a slum. This designation has been questioned.

The neighbourhood was started in 1841 with Agar's widow leasing out small plots on the north side of the canal. Ownership passed to the Church Commissioners, who sold it to the Midland Railway. The company demolished most of the housing to make way for warehouses supplying St Pancras railway station from 1866.

The name of Agar Town is commemorated by Agar Grove which traces an edge and which was St Paul's Road in "Camden Town".

Cultural reference

The place is sung about in a folk-style song of Richard Guard and Anna Crockatt The River Don't Run, included on an album by Nick Hart. The song describes the demolition of Agar Town and the disappearance of the Fleet river or stream as it was diverted underground to make way for St Pancras railway station.

See also
Camley Street Natural Park
Camden Town Murder

References

External links
 
Mapping Poverty in Agar Town: Economic Conditions Prior to the Development of St. Pancras Station In 1866
Saint Thomas, Agar Town: Camden
"Agar Town, Camden" on hidden-london.com

Areas of London
Districts of the London Borough of Camden